The 1984 Cal State Fullerton Titans football team represented California State University, Fullerton as a member of the Pacific Coast Athletic Association (PCAA) during the 1984 NCAA Division I-A football season. Led by fifth-year head coach Gene Murphy, Cal State Fullerton finished the season with an overall record of 11–1 and a mark of 6–1 in conference play, placing second in the PCAA behind UNLV, who dealt the Titans their only defeat of the season. Cal State Fullerton played its home games at Santa Ana Stadium in Santa Ana, California. This was the fourth home venue for the Titans in three years, but they continued playing in Santa Ana Stadium for the next eight season.

In March 1985, it was found that UNLV had used several ineligible players during the 1983 and 1984 seasons. As a result, UNLV was forced to forfeit all of their victories in those two seasons. With the forfeit from UNLV, Cal State Fullerton's 1984 record improved to 12–0 overall and 7–0 in conference play, giving the Titans the PCAA title. 1984 was the most successful of the Cal State Fullerton Titans football program's 23 seasons of competition.

Schedule

Team players in the NFL
The following Cal State Fullerton Titans were selected in the 1985 NFL Draft.

The following finished their college career in 1984, were not drafted, but played in the NFL.

Notes

References

Cal State Fullerton
Cal State Fullerton Titans football seasons
Big West Conference football champion seasons
College football undefeated seasons
Cal State Fullerton Titans football